Legionella is a genus of pathogenic gram-negative bacteria that includes the species L. pneumophila, causing legionellosis (all illnesses caused by Legionella) including a pneumonia-type illness called Legionnaires' disease and a mild flu-like illness called Pontiac fever.

Legionella may be visualized with a silver stain or cultured in cysteine-containing media such as buffered charcoal yeast extract agar. It is common in many environments, including soil and aquatic systems, with at least 50 species and 70 serogroups identified. These bacteria, however, are not transmissible from person to person; furthermore, most people exposed to the bacteria do not become ill. Most outbreaks are traced to poorly maintained cooling towers.

The side chains of the cell wall carry the bases responsible for the somatic antigen specificity of these organisms. The chemical composition of these side chains both with respect to components and arrangement of the different sugars determines the nature of the somatic or O antigen determinants, which are essential means of serologically classifying many gram-negative bacteria.

Legionella acquired its name after an outbreak in 1976 of a then-unknown "mystery disease" sickened 221 people, causing 34 deaths. The outbreak was first noticed among attendees at a convention of the American Legion—an association of U.S. military veterans. The convention occurred in Philadelphia during the U.S. Bicentennial year on July 21–24, 1976. This epidemic among U.S. war veterans, occurring in the same city as—and within days of the 200th anniversary of—the signing of the Declaration of Independence, was widely publicized and caused great concern in the United States. On January 18, 1977, the causative agent was identified as a previously unknown bacterium subsequently named Legionella.

Detection 
Legionella is traditionally detected by culture on buffered charcoal yeast extract agar. It requires the presence of cysteine and iron to grow, so does not grow on common blood agar media used for laboratory-based total viable counts or on-site dipslides. Common laboratory procedures for the detection of Legionella in water concentrate the bacteria (by centrifugation and/or filtration through 0.2-μm filters) before inoculation onto a charcoal yeast extract agar containing selective agents (e.g. glycine, vancomycin, polymixin, cyclohexamide, GVPC) to suppress other flora in the sample. Heat or acid treatment are also used to reduce interference from other microbes in the sample.

After incubation for up to 10 days, suspect colonies are confirmed as Legionella if they grow on buffered charcoal yeast extract agar containing cysteine, but not on agar without cysteine added.  Immunological techniques are then commonly used to determine the species and/or serogroups of bacteria present in the sample.

Although the plating method is quite specific for most species of Legionella, one study has shown that a coculture method that accounts for the close relationship with amoebae may be more sensitive, since it can detect the presence of the bacteria even when masked by their presence inside the amoebae. Consequently, the clinical and environmental prevalences of the bacteria are likely to be underestimated due to the current laboratory methodology.

Many hospitals use the Legionella urinary antigen test for initial detection when Legionella pneumonia is suspected. Some of the advantages offered by this test are that the results can be obtained in hours rather than the several days required for culture, and that a urine specimen is generally more easily obtained than a sputum specimen. Disadvantages are that the urine antigen test only detects antigen of Legionella pneumophila serogroup 1 (LP1); only a culture will detect infection by non-LP1 strains or other Legionella species and that isolates of Legionella are not obtained, which impairs public health investigations of outbreaks.

New techniques for the rapid detection of Legionella in water samples have been developed, including the use of polymerase chain reaction and rapid immunological assays. These technologies can typically provide much faster results.

Government public-health surveillance has demonstrated increasing proportions of drinking water–associated outbreaks, specifically in healthcare settings.

Analyses of genome sequences from Legionellales have identified 24 conserved signature indels (CSIs) in diverse proteins including 30S ribosomal protein S8, periplasmic serine endoprotease DegP precursor, DNA polymerase I, and ABC transporter permease, etc. that are specifically present in different species from the genus Legionella. These molecular signatures provide novel and reliable means for distinguishing members of the genus Legionella from all other bacteria and for their diagnostics.

Pathogenesis 

In the natural environment, Legionella lives within amoebae such as Acanthamoeba spp., Naegleria spp.,  Vermamoeba spp., or other protozoa such as Tetrahymena pyriformis.

Upon inhalation, the bacteria can infect alveolar macrophages, where they can replicate. This results in Legionnaires' disease and the less severe illness Pontiac fever. Legionella transmission is via inhalation of water droplets from a contaminated source that has allowed the organism to grow and spread (e.g., cooling towers). Transmission also occurs less commonly via aspiration of drinking water from an infected source. Person-to-person transmission has not been demonstrated, though it could be possible in rare cases.

Once inside a host, the incubation period may be up to two weeks. Prodromal symptoms are flu-like, including fever, chills, and dry cough. Advanced stages of the disease cause problems with the gastrointestinal tract and the nervous system and lead to diarrhea and nausea. Other advanced symptoms of pneumonia may also present. However, the disease is generally not a threat to most healthy individuals, and tends to lead to severe symptoms more often in immunocompromised hosts and the elderly. Consequently, the water systems of hospitals and nursing homes should be periodically monitored. The Texas Department of State Health Services provides recommendations for hospitals to detect and prevent the spread of hospital-acquired disease due to Legionella infection.  According to Infection Control and Hospital Epidemiology, hospital-acquired Legionella pneumonia has a fatality rate of 28%, and the source is the water distribution system.

Legionella species typically exist in nature at low concentrations, in groundwater, lakes, and streams. They reproduce after entering man-made equipment, given the right environmental conditions. In the United States, the disease affects between 8,000 and 18,000 individuals a year.

Sources 
Documented sources include cooling towers, swimming pools (especially in Scandinavian countries), domestic water systems and showers, ice-making machines, refrigerated cabinets, whirlpool spas, hot springs, fountains, dental equipment, soil, automobile windshield washer fluid, industrial coolant, and waste water treatment plants.

Airborne transmission 
The largest and one of the most common source of Legionnaires' disease outbreaks are cooling towers (heat rejection equipment used in air conditioning and industrial cooling water systems) primarily because of the risk for widespread circulation. Many governmental agencies, cooling tower manufacturers, and industrial trade organisations have developed design and maintenance guidelines for controlling the growth and proliferation of Legionella within cooling towers.

Research in the Journal of Infectious Diseases (2006) provided evidence that L. pneumophila, the causative agent of Legionnaires' disease, can travel at least 6 km from its source by airborne spread. It was previously believed that transmission of the bacterium was restricted to much shorter distances. A team of French scientists reviewed the details of an epidemic of Legionnaires' disease that took place in Pas-de-Calais, northern France, in 2003–2004. Of 86 confirmed cases during the outbreak, 18 resulted in death. The source of infection was identified as a cooling tower in a petrochemical plant, and an analysis of those affected in the outbreak revealed that some infected people lived as far as 6–7 km from the plant.

Because of these risks,  a UK legal mandate requires owners to notify the local authorities of any cooling towers a company operates.  Cooling Tower Notification

Recreational exposure 
As outlined above, cooling towers are well established as sources of Legionella that may have an effect on community exposure to the bacterium and Legionnaires' disease epidemics.  In addition to cooling towers, use of swimming pools, spa pools, and other recreational water bodies has also been shown to increase risk of exposure to Legionella, though this differs by species of Legionella. In a review of disease caused by recreational exposure to Legionella, most exposures occurred in spas or pools used by the public (hotels or recreational centers) or in natural settings (hot springs or thermal water).

Hotels and other tourist destinations have contributed to Legionella exposure. Relative danger at commonly used facilities with heating and cooling water systems depends on several factors, such as the water source, how much Legionella is present (if there is any), if and how the water system is treated, how people are interacting with this water, and other factors that make the water systems so dynamic.

In addition to tourists and other recreators, gardeners may be at increased risk for exposure to Legionella. In some countries (like Australia), Legionella lives in soil and compost. Warmer temperatures and increased rainfall in some regions of the world due to climate change may impact Legionella in soil, gardeners seasonal exposure to contaminated soil, and complex water systems used by the public.

Exposure related to natural disasters and climate change 
Not only are Legionella spp. present in man-made water systems and infrastructure, but this bacteria also lives in natural bodies of water, such as lakes and rivers. Weather patterns and other environmental factors may increase risk of Legionella outbreaks; a study in Minnesota, USA, using outbreak information from 2011 to 2018 showed precipitation as having the greatest effect of increasing risk of Legionella exposure when taking into account other environmental factors (temperature, relative humidity, land use and age of infected person). Weather patterns heavily relate to the established infrastructure and water sources, especially in urban settings. In the US, most cases of Legionella infection have occurred in the summertime, though they were likely more associated with rainfall and humidity than summer temperatures. Severe rain patterns can increase risk of water source contamination through flooding and unseasonable rains; therefore, natural disasters, especially those associated with climate change, may increase risk of exposure to Legionella.

Vaccine research 
No vaccine is available for legionellosis. Vaccination studies using heat-killed or acetone-killed cells have been carried out in guinea pigs, which were then given Legionella intraperitoneally or by aerosol. Both vaccines were shown to give moderately high levels of protection. Protection was dose-dependent and correlated with antibody levels as measured by enzyme-linked immunosorbent assay to an outer membrane antigen and by indirect immunofluorescence to heat-killed cells.  However, a licensed vaccine is most likely still many years away.

Molecular biology 
Legionella has been discovered to be a genetically diverse species with 7-11% of genes strain-specific. The molecular function of some of the proven virulence factors of Legionella have been discovered.

Legionella control 
A biomonitoring solution exists in a Legionella-specific aptamer-based assay. Control of Legionella growth can occur through chemical, thermal or ultraviolet treatment methods.

Heat 
The more expensive option is temperature control—i.e., keeping all cold water below  and all hot water above . The high cost incurred with this method arises from the extensive retrofitting required for existing complex distribution systems in large facilities and the energy cost of chilling or heating the water and maintaining the required temperatures at all times and at all distal points within the system.

Temperature affects the survival of Legionella as follows:
 Above  – Legionella dies almost instantly
 At  – 90% die in 2 minutes (Decimal reduction time (D) = 2 minutes)
 At  – 90% die in 80–124 minutes, depending on strain (D = 80–124 minutes)
  – can survive but do not multiply
  – ideal growth range
  – growth range
 Below  – can survive, even below freezing, but are dormant

Other temperature sensitivity
  to  – Disinfection range
  – Legionella dies within 2 minutes
  – Legionella dies within 32 minutes
  – Legionella dies within 5 to 6 hours

Water can be monitored in real-time with sensors.

Chlorine 
A very effective chemical treatment is chlorine. For systems with marginal issues, chlorine provides effective results at >0.5 ppm residual in the hot water system. For systems with significant Legionella problems, temporary shock chlorination—where levels are raised to higher than 2 ppm for a period of 24 hours or more and then returned to 0.5 ppm—may be effective. Hyperchlorination can also be used where the water system is taken out of service and the chlorine residual is raised to 50 ppm or higher at all distal points for 24 hours or more. The system is then flushed and returned to 0.5 ppm chlorine prior to being placed back into service. These high levels of chlorine penetrate biofilm, killing both the Legionella bacteria and the host organisms. Annual hyperchlorination can be an effective part of a comprehensive Legionella preventive action plan.

Copper-silver ionization 
Industrial-sized copper-silver ionization is recognized by the U.S. Environmental Protection Agency and WHO for Legionella control and prevention. Copper and silver ion concentrations must be maintained at optimal levels, taking into account both water flow and overall water usage, to control Legionella. The disinfection function within all of a facility's water distribution network occurs within 30 to 45 days. Key engineering features such as 10 amps per ion chamber cell and automated variable voltage outputs having no less than 100 VDC are but a few of the required features for proper Legionella control and prevention, using a specific, nonreferenced copper-silver system. Swimming pool ion generators are not designed for potable water treatment.

Questions remain whether the silver and copper ion concentrations required for effective control of symbiotic hosts could exceed those allowed under the U.S. Safe Drinking Water Act's Lead and Copper Rule. In any case, any facility or public water system using copper-silver for disinfection should monitor its copper and silver ion concentrations to ensure they are within intended levels – both minimum and maximum. Further, no current standards for silver in the EU and other regions allow use of this technology.

Copper-silver ionization is an effective process to control Legionella in potable water distribution systems found in health facilities, hotels, nursing homes, and most large buildings. However, it is not intended for cooling towers because of pH levels greater than 8.6, that cause ionic copper to precipitate. Furthermore, tolyltriazole, a common additive in cooling water treatment, could bind the copper making it ineffective. Ionization became the first such hospital disinfection process to have fulfilled a proposed four-step modality evaluation; by then, it had been adopted by over 100 hospitals. Additional studies indicate ionization is superior to thermal eradication.

Chlorine dioxide 
Chlorine dioxide has been approved by the U.S. Environmental Protection Agency as a primary disinfectant of potable water since 1945. Chlorine dioxide does not produce any carcinogenic byproducts like chlorine when used in the purification of drinking water that contains natural organic compounds such as humic and fulvic acids; chlorine tends to form halogenated disinfection byproducts such as trihalomethanes. Drinking water containing such disinfection byproducts has been shown to increase the risk of cancer. ClO2 works differently from chlorine; its action is one of pure oxidation rather than halogenation, so these halogenated byproducts are not formed.
Chlorine dioxide is not a restricted heavy metal like copper. It has proven excellent control of Legionella in cold and hot water systems and its ability as a biocide is not affected by pH, or any water corrosion inhibitors such as silica or phosphate. However, it is 'quenched' by metal oxides, especially manganese and iron. Metal oxide concentrations above 0.5 mg/L may inhibit its activity. Monochloramine is an alternative. Like chlorine and chlorine dioxide, monochloramine is approved by the Environmental Protection Agency as a primary potable water disinfectant. Environmental Protection Agency registration requires a biocide label which lists toxicity and other data required for all registered biocides. If the product is being sold as a biocide, then the manufacturer is legally required to supply a biocide label, and the purchaser is legally required to apply the biocide per the biocide label. When first applied to a system, chlorine dioxide can be added at disinfection levels of 2 ppm for 6 hours to clean up a system.  This will not remove all biofilm, but will effectively remediate the system of Legionella.

Moist heat sterilization 

Ultraviolet 
Ultraviolet light, in the range of 200 to 300 nm, can inactivate Legionella. According to a review by the US EPA, three-log (99.9%) inactivation can be achieved with a dose of less than 7 mJ/cm2.

Biomonitoring 
A Legionella-specific aptamer has been discovered and in 2022 was developed into an assay for detecting to a limit of 104.3 cells/mL with no processing steps.

European standards 
Several European countries established the European Working Group for Legionella Infections to share knowledge and experience about monitoring potential sources of Legionella. The working group has published guidelines about the actions to be taken to limit the number of colony-forming units (that is, live bacteria that are able to multiply) of Legionella per litre:

Monitoring guidelines are stated in Approved Code of Practice L8 in the UK. These are not mandatory, but are widely regarded as so. An employer or property owner must follow an Approved Code of Practice, or achieve the same result. Failure to show monitoring records to at least this standard has resulted in several high-profile prosecutions, e.g. Nalco + Bulmers – neither could prove a sufficient scheme to be in place while investigating an outbreak, therefore both were fined about £300,000GBP. Important case law in this area is R v Trustees of the Science Museum 3 All ER 853, (1993) 1 WLR 1171

Employers and those responsible for premises within the UK are required under Control of Substances Hazardous to Health to undertake an assessment of the risks arising from Legionella. This risk assessment may be very simple for low risk premises, however for larger or higher risk properties may include a narrative of the site, asset register, simplified schematic drawings, recommendations on compliance, and a proposed monitoring scheme.

The L8 Approved Code of Practice recommends that the risk assessment should be reviewed at least every 2 years and whenever a reason exists to suspect it is no longer valid, such as water systems have been amended or modified, or if the use of the water system has changed, or if there is reason to suspect that Legionella control measures are no longer working.

Weaponization 
Legionella could be used as a weapon, and indeed genetic modification of L. pneumophila has been shown where the mortality rate in infected animals can be increased to nearly 100%. A former Soviet bioengineer, Sergei Popov, stated in 2000 that his team experimented with genetically enhanced bioweapons, including Legionella. Popov worked as a lead researcher at the Vector Institute from 1976 to 1986, then at Obolensk until 1992, when he defected to the West. He later divulged much of the Soviet biological weapons program and settled in the United States.

See also 
 Environmental microbiology
 List of Legionnaires' disease outbreaks
 Microbiomes of the built environment

References

External links 

 European Working Group for Legionella Infections
 Centers for Disease Control and Prevention—Procedure for Cleaning Cooling Towers and Related Equipment (pages 239 and 240 of 249)
 California Energy Commission—Cooling Water Management Program Guidelines For Wet and Hybrid Cooling Towers at Power Plants
 ASHRAE Guideline
 Guidelines for Control of Legionella in Ornamental Fountains
 Employers Guidelines for prevention of Legionella

Bacteria genera
Bacterial diseases
Gram-negative bacteria
Industrial hygiene
Legionellales
Pathogenic bacteria